Duco may refer to:

Duco, a brand of automotive lacquer created by the DuPont Company
Duco, Kentucky, a community in Magoffin County
Duco Boxing, boxing promotion company in New Zealand
Mike Duco, a Canadian hockey player